The following is the complete discography of English pop band Thompson Twins.

Albums

Studio albums

Compilation albums

The following compilations were released in various territories but did not chart:

The Best of Thompson Twins (1991)
The Collection (1993)
Singles Collection (1996)
Greatest Hits (1996)
The Best of Thompson Twins (1998)
Master Hits (1999)
Hold Me Now (2000)
Platinum & Gold Collection (2003)
The Greatest Hits (2003)
12 Inch Collection (2004)
Love on Your Side – The Best of Thompson Twins (2007)
Remixes & Rarities (2014)

Singles

A"Squares and Triangles" was released on its own independent label, Dirty Discs in April 1980, and was re-released as a free single with the album Set on 26 February 1982.
B"She's in Love with Mystery" was released in November 1980 through independent label Latent.
C"Roll Over", released 12 April 1985 on 7" & 12" vinyl, was intended to be the first official single for Here's to Future Days. It was withdrawn the day of release, but some copies were sold and made it into the public.It featured a different version of the song with the 12" extended version titled "Roll Over (Again)".  The b-side was a semi-instrumental version of "King for a Day" titled "Fools in Paradise". 
D"Bush Baby" was released in 1987 as a promo 7" single with an exclusive 7" single version b/w "Follow Your Heart" on Arista Records.
E"Who Wants to Be a Millionaire?" was released in December 1990, as the clearly labelled B-side to Deborah Harry & Iggy Pop's "Well Did You Evah?" on 7", 12" vinyl and CD single to promote the AIDS benefit album Red Hot + Blue.  Only the Harry/Pop A-side charted.

Music videos 

 "Lies" (1982)
 "Love on Your Side" (1983)
 "Watching" (1983)
 "Hold Me Now" (1983)
 "We are Detective" (1983)
 "Doctor! Doctor!" (1984)
 "You Take Me Up" (1984)
 "Sister of Mercy" (1984)
 "Lay Your Hands on Me" (1984)
 "Don't Mess with Doctor Dream" (1985)
 "King for a Day" (1985)
 "Revolution" (1985)
 "Nothing in Common" (1986)
 "Get That Love" (1987)
 "Long Goodbye" (1987)
 "Sugar Daddy" (1989)
 "Bombers in the Sky" (1990)
 "Come Inside" (1991)
 "The Saint" (1992)

Videography

Soundtrack appearances
Ghostbusters (1984) - "In the Name of Love"
Sixteen Candles (1984) - "If You Were Here"
Explorers (1985) - "Doctor! Doctor!"
Perfect (1985) - "Lay Your Hands on Me"
Nothing in Common (1986) - "Nothing in Common"
Lucas (1986) - "King For a Day"
Gremlins 2: The New Batch (1990) - "Bombers in the Sky"
Cool World (1992) - "Play with Me" and "Industry and Seduction" (Tom Bailey)
The Wedding Singer (1997) - "Hold Me Now"
Not Another Teen Movie (2001) - "If You Were Here"

Video game
The Thompson Twins Adventure (1984) - A video game adaptation of "Doctor! Doctor!"

References

External links
Thompson Twins discography page with track listings and identification of unlabelled song variations

Discography
Discographies of British artists
Pop music group discographies
New wave discographies